Erastus Shuumbwa (born 24 August 1974) is a Namibian businessman, farmer and politician. He has been serving as a Member of the National Assembly of Namibia for the All People's Party since March 2020. He is the party's parliamentary chief whip.

Biography
Erastus Shuumbwa was born on 24 August 1974 in Ondukutu, South West Africa. He studied law at Triumphant College. He is a businessman and a farmer.

Shuumbwa joined the All People's Party and was elected to the National Assembly in November 2019. He took office as an MP on 20 March 2020. He serves as the party's chief whip.

References

Living people
1974 births
All People's Party (Namibia) politicians
Members of the National Assembly (Namibia)